Těžkej Pokondr was a Czech comedy band consisting of Miloš Pokorný and Roman Ondráček. Pokondr is a portmanteau of their surnames and it was proposed to them by Ondřej Hejma. The duo was known for their humorous cover versions of popular local and international pop music hits as well as original songs intended to parody well-known topics. An example of this was the song "Prejs to čmajz" (They Say You Stole It), which references the 'Chile pen incident', in which former Czech president Václav Klaus was caught on video stealing a pen during a state visit to Chile in 2011.
The lyrics of their songs were usually written in Common Czech or in Central Bohemian dialect and were littered with puns to increase the humorous effect. The majority of their lyrics were written by Lou Fanánek Hagen, a well-known Czech musician and frontman of the band Tři sestry.

In 2010, the duo began hosting a radio show called Den začíná v osm on the private channel Frekvence 1.
After seven years, on 31 October 31, 2017, they cancelled the show due to a disagreement with their supervisor Miroslav Škoda, who did not allow them to invite the investigative journalist Jaroslav Kmenta onto the show before the 2017 Czech legislative election. According to some sources, this was part of an ongoing long-term dispute which the band considered to be censorship.
The two also had a separate talk show in 2011, titled Pokondr live, on Česká televize.

Těžkej Pokondr split up in 2019. Since 2020, Roman Ondráček has been performing solo under the name Lehkej Pokondr A Rakeťáci. He released his first single, "Ještě, že mám plnou Nádrž", the same year.

Discography
Studio albums
 Sbohem Tvá Máňa (1996)
 Víc než Gottzila (1998)
 Vypusťte Krakena (1999)
 Ježek v peci (2000)
 Jéžišmarjá (2001)
 Kuss (2003)
 Safírový Jadel (2005)
 Superalbum (2011)
 Star Boys (2017)

Compilations
 Super Těžkej Pokondr (1999)
 Best of: 20 Největších Hitů (2008)
 14 nejhorších kousků (2013)
 Best of II. (2014)

Bootlegs
 Zakázané uvolnění (1998)

DVDs
 Tucatero aneb po práci legraci! (2003 documentary)

References

External links
 

Czech pop music groups
Musical groups established in 1995
1995 establishments in the Czech Republic
Musical groups disestablished in 2019